The Hum Award for Most Impactful Character is one of the Hum Awards of Merit presented annually by the Hum Television Network and Entertainment Channel (HTNEC). It is given in an honor of an actor or actress who has delivered an outstanding performance in an impactful character who has significant influence on a story, while working within the Television industry. The award has commonly been referred to as the hum for "Most Impactful Character".  Currently, nominees are determined by single transferable vote, within the actors and jury branch of HTNEC; winners are selected by a plurality vote from the entire eligible voting members of the Hum. This awards is equivalent to the Hum Award for Best Actor Popular, which is given in the ceremony but winners are solely  selected by viewers votings. Multiple nominations for an actor in same category but for different work is eligible. Also actresses and actors are jointly nominated in this category.   

Since its inception at Second year ceremony, total of three actresses has been awarded. Sakina Samo and Isra Ghazal were tied for the award at 2nd Hum Awards. As of 2017 ceremony, Bushra Ansari is the most recent winner of this category for her role in Udaari.

Winners and nominees
In the list below, winners are listed first in the colored row, followed by the other nominees. Following the hum's practice, the dramas below are listed by year of their Pakistan qualifying run, which is usually (but not always) the drama's year of release. As of the first ceremony, four soap actors were nominated for the award. For the first ceremony, the eligibility period spanned full calendar years. For example, the 1st Hum Awards presented on April 28, 2013, to recognized soap actors of dramas that were released between January, 2012, and December, 2012, the period of eligibility is the full previous calendar year from January 1 to December 31. However, this rule was subjected to change when at third year ceremony two (Sadqay Tumhare and Digest Writer) of seven nominated drama serials were running on TV at the time when nominations were announced.

Date and the award ceremony shows that the 2010 is the period from 2010-2020 (10 years-decade), while the year above winners and nominees shows that the dramas year in which they were telecast, and the figure in bracket shows the ceremony number, for example; an award ceremony is held for the dramas of its previous year.

2010s

See also 
 Hum Awards
 Hum Awards pre-show
 List of Hum Awards Ceremonies

References

External links
Official websites
 Hum Awards official website
 Hum Television Network and Entertainment Channel (HTNEC)
 Hum's Channel at YouTube (run by the Hum Television Network and Entertainment Channel)
 Hum Awards at Facebook (run by the Hum Television Network and Entertainment Channel)]

Hum Awards
Hum Award winners
Hum TV
Hum Network Limited